Phil Amato anchors Action News Jax This Morning from 5-9am every weekday on WFOX-30 and from 5-7am on WJAX-47 in Jacksonville, Florida. He also anchors Action News Jax at Noon on WJAX-47. Phil is a former weekday anchor on First Coast News at WTLV/WJXX in Jacksonville, Florida.  Amato co-anchored Good Morning Jacksonville Sunrise and Good Morning Jacksonville, the weekday broadcasts from 5 to 7 a.m., with Joy Purdy. Amato also co-anchored the weeknight 5:30 newscast of First Coast News with Donna Deegan.

He was responsible for the local business reports on First Coast News. Phil was also responsible for the critically hailed First Coast News documentary special on Jacksonville's "Great Fire of 1901".

Amato worked as the main anchor at KBCI-TV (now KBOI-TV) in Boise, Idaho prior to arriving at First Coast News in 1993. He started his TV career in Billings, Montana in 1987 as an anchor/reporter. He was born in San Francisco and went to high school and college in Tacoma.

Phil resigned from First Coast News on Monday, July 28, 2014.

Amato is married and has two children.

References

External links
 First Coast News Phil Amato Bio

American television journalists
Television anchors from Jacksonville, Florida
Year of birth missing (living people)
Living people
People from Billings, Montana
American male journalists
Journalists from Montana